Golanthara is a village located in the southern part of Ganjam District of Odisha.

Villages in Ganjam district